Hymenia lophoceralis is a moth in the family Crambidae. It was described by George Hampson in 1912. It is found on New Guinea.

References

Moths described in 1912
Spilomelinae